Cotyttia (Kotuttiā) was an orgiastic, nocturnal religious festival of ancient Greece and Thrace in celebration of Kotys, the goddess of sex, considered an aspect of Persephone.

Celebration

Cotyttia originated with the Edones as a celebration of the rape of Persephone. Throughout Thrace it was celebrated secretly in the hills at night, and was notorious for its obscenity and insobriety.

Through influence of trade and commerce, the Edonian form of the festival spread to Athens, Corinth, and Chios, where its mark became so pronounced that "companion of Cotytto" became synonymous with "slut".

In Sicily the rites of Cotyttia were much more mundane, celebrating the waxing aspect of Persephone.

References

Festivals in ancient Greece
Religious festivals in Greece
Thracian religion
Ancient Greek Thrace
Sex festivals